Creugas bajulus is a species of true spider in the family Corinnidae. It is found in Mexico.

References

Corinnidae
Articles created by Qbugbot
Spiders described in 1942